Walter Andrew Slowakiewicz (May 20, 1911 – October 19, 1978) was born in Shenandoah, Pennsylvania. He was ordained to the priesthood in the Polish National Catholic Church by Leon Grochowski on March 3, 1933, in Scranton, Pennsylvania. He was consecrated bishop on June 26, 1968, and served as fourth bishop of the Eastern Diocese of the Polish National Catholic Church from 1972 until his death.

References
 The History of All Saints Cathedral of the Polish National Catholic Church (Chicago, Illinois, 1996)

American bishops
Bishops of the Polish National Catholic Church
1911 births
1978 deaths
American people of Polish descent
People from Shenandoah, Pennsylvania
20th-century American clergy